Oumar Mamadou Mangane (Arabic: عمر مامادو مانجان; born 31 December 1992) is a Mauritanian professional footballer who plays as a centre-back for Super D1 club Nouadhibou and the Mauritania national team.

Honours 
Nouadhibou

 Super D1: 2017–18, 2018–19, 2019–20, 2020–21
 Mauritanian President's Cup: 2016–17, 2017–18
 Mauritanian Super Cup: 2018

References 

1992 births
Living people
Mauritanian footballers
Association football central defenders
FC Nouadhibou players
Super D1 players
Mauritania international footballers
Mauritania A' international footballers
2018 African Nations Championship players